British Standard Fine (BSF) is a screw thread form, as a fine-pitch alternative to British Standard Whitworth (BSW) thread.
It was used for steel bolts and nuts on and in much of Britain's machinery, including cars, prior to adoption of Unified, and later Metric, standards. For highly stressed conditions, especially in motorcycles, a finer thread, British Standard Cycle (BSC), was used as well.

BSF was developed by R. E. B. Crompton, and his assistant George Field. BSF threads use the 55 degree Whitworth thread form. It was introduced by the British Engineering Standards Association in 1908.

The table provides BSF sizes, the threads per inch and spanner jaw sizes. The BSC column indicates where BSF and BSC threads match. The table shows suitable tapping drill sizes. Uncommon sizes are shown in italics.

Table 

{| class="wikitable"
|-
! colspan=3 | Diameter
!             Thread density
! rowspan=2 | As BSC?
! colspan=2 | Nut, approximate
! rowspan=2 | Tap drill
|-
! colspan=2 | (in)
!           | (mm)
!             (in−1)
!           | (mm)
!           | (in)
|-
| 
| 
| 32
| 
|  6pt  
|  in
|-
| 
| 
| 28
| 
| colspan=2 |
| 4.6 mm
|-
| 
| 
| 26
| 
| 11.30
|
| 5.3 mm
|-
| 
| 
| 22
| rowspan=13 
|  
|  in
|-
| 
| 
| 20 
|  
| 8.2 mm
|-
| 
| 
| 18 
| 
| 9.7 mm
|-
| 
| 
| 16 
| 
|  in
|-
| 
| 
| 16 
| 
|  in
|-
| 
| 
| 14 
|  6pt 
| 14 mm
|-
| 
| 
| 14 
|  6pt  
| 15.5 mm
|-
| 
| 
| 12 
|  6pt  
| 16.75 mm
|-
| 
| 
| 11 
|  
|  in
|-
| 1
| 
| 10 
| 
| 22.75 mm
|-
| 
| 
| 9 
| 
| 26.50 mm
|-
| 
| 
| 9 
|  
| 28.75 mm
|-
| 
| 
| 8  
| 
| 34.50 mm
|}

References

Bibliography

External links
 
 Jaw sizes for sockets and spanners/wrenches
 Spanner size chart

Thread standards
Screws
1908 introductions
Standards of the United Kingdom